Failure in the Saddle: Nathan Bedford Forrest, Joseph Wheeler, and the Confederate Cavalry in the Chickamauga Campaign  is a book written by Virginia Military Institute graduate David A. Powell, and published by Savas Beatie, analyzing the failures of Nathan Bedford Forrest and Joseph Wheeler in the American Civil War. Powell draws upon firsthand accounts, many previously unpublished, to offer a detailed examination of the Southern cavalry's role in the Chickamauga campaign.

Recognition
Winner, 2011, Richard Harwell Award, Given by the Civil War Round Table of Atlanta for the best book on a Civil War topic published in the proceeding year.

References

Suggested Reading
The Maps of Chickamauga: An Atlas of the Chickamauga Campaign, Including the Tullahoma Operations, June 22 - September 23, 1863 by David Powell and David Friedrichs

External links 
 Official site
 Author's site
 Book trailer (on YouTube)

2010 non-fiction books
21st-century history books
History books about the American Civil War
Nathan Bedford Forrest